The 1900 Dickinson football team was an American football team that represented Dickinson College as an independent during the 1900 college football season. The team compiled a 5–5 record and outscored opponents by a total of 119 to 83. Sam Boyle was the head coach.

Schedule

References

Dickinson
Dickinson Red Devils football seasons
Dickinson football